South Dakota state elections in 2022 were held on Tuesday, November 8, 2022. Primary elections were held on June 7, 2022 (with runoffs on August 16, 2022).

All of South Dakota's executive officers were up for election as well as South Dakota's at-large seat in the United States House of Representatives.

Federal

United States Senate

Incumbent three-term Republican U.S. Senator John Thune, who is the Senate Minority Whip, won the Republican primary against Bruce Whalen and Mark Mowry. Thune was reelected to a fourth term, defeating Democrat Brian Bengs.

United States House of Representatives

Incumbent Republican U.S. Representative Dusty Johnson won the Republican primary against Taffy Howard. No Democrats filed to run, and Johnson defeated his only challenger, a Libertarian.

Statewide

Governor and Lieutenant Governor

Incumbent Republican Governor Kristi Noem defeated Democratic nominee Representative Jamie Smith to win reelection.

Attorney General

Incumbent Republican Attorney General Jason Ravnsborg did not seek reelection.

Secretary of State

Incumbent Republican Secretary of State Steve Barnett won reelection.

State Treasurer
Incumbent Republican State Treasurer Josh Haeder won reelection.

State Auditor

Public Utilities Commission

Ballot measures

Constitutional Amendment C

2022 South Dakota Amendment C was on the June 7 primary ballot. The amendment intended to require future ballot measures that would cost more than ten million dollars to receive 60% of the vote to be approved, instead of a simple majority. It was rejected by a significant margin.

Results

Constitutional Amendment D

2022 South Dakota Amendment D was a citizen-initiated state constitutional amendment on the November 8 general election ballot. The amendment intended to expand Medicaid eligibility. The amendment passed with around 56% of the vote.

Results

References

External links

2022 South Dakota elections
South Dakota